Nugget Point Lighthouse is a lighthouse at Nugget Point in the Otago region of the South Island of New Zealand. It is owned and operated by Maritime New Zealand.

History 
The lighthouse was built from 1869 to 1870 and first lit on 4 July 1870. The tower was constructed from locally quarried stone. The lighting apparatus that was installed had come to New Zealand on the same ship as the lighthouse designer James Balfour in 1863 and was originally intended for the lighthouse at Cape Saunders. With the project on Otago Peninsula experiencing many delays, the lighting apparatus was used at Nugget Point instead.

In 1901 Walter Hutton Champion was the lighthouse keeper along with his wife Alice.

Originally, the lighthouse was powered by an oil burner.  In 1949 the oil lamp was replaced with an electric 1000 W lamp powered by a local diesel generator.  The generator was replaced in the 1960s by a connection to the mains grid although the original lens for the light remained in place and continued to be used.

The light was fully automated in 1989 and is now monitored and managed from a Maritime New Zealand control room in Wellington. In 2006, the original light was replaced with an LED beacon, powered by mains and backed up by battery. The lighthouse was solarized in May 2020 and now has no mains power.

An easy 20-minute return walking track leads from the car park at the end of The Nuggets Road to a viewing platform right next to the lighthouse overlooking "The Nuggets".  The lighthouse itself is fenced off.

See also 

 List of lighthouses in New Zealand

References

External links 

 
 Lighthouses of New Zealand Maritime New Zealand

Lighthouses completed in 1870
Lighthouses in New Zealand
The Catlins
Tourist attractions in Otago
1870s architecture in New Zealand
Transport buildings and structures in Otago
Clutha District